{{Infobox military unit
|unit_name= Iowa Air National Guard
|image= File:Iowa Air National Guard - Emblem.png
|image_size= 220px
|caption= Shield of the Iowa Air National Guard
|dates= 23 August 1946 - present
|country=
|allegiance= 
|branch= 
|type=
|role= "To meet state and federal mission responsibilities."
|size=
|command_structure=  Air National GuardIowa National Guard
|garrison= Iowa Air National Guard, 7105 NW 70th Avenue, Johnston, Iowa, 50131
|garrison_label=
|nickname=
|patron=
|motto=
|colors=
|colors_label=
|march=
|mascot=
|battles=
|anniversaries=
|decorations=
|battle_honours=

|commander1= President Joe Biden(Commander-in-Chief)Frank Kendall III(Secretary of the Air Force)Governor Kim Reynolds''(Governor of the State of Iowa)
|commander1_label= Civilian leadership
|commander2= Major General Benjamin Corell (Adjutant General)
 Brigadier General Shawn Ford (Assistant Adjutant, Air)
|commander2_label= State military leadership
|notable_commanders=

|aircraft_tanker=  KC-135R Stratotanker
|aircraft_transport=
|aircraft_attack=
|aircraft_bomber=
|aircraft_electronic=
|aircraft_fighter= MQ-9 Reaper
|aircraft_helicopter=
|aircraft_helicopter_attack=
|aircraft_helicopter_cargo=
|aircraft_helicopter_multirole=
|aircraft_helicopter_observation=
|aircraft_helicopter_transport=
|aircraft_helicopter_trainer=
|aircraft_helicopter_utility=
|aircraft_interceptor=
|aircraft_patrol=
|aircraft_recon=
|aircraft_trainer=
}}

The Iowa Air National Guard (IA ANG)''' is the aerial militia of the State of Iowa, United States of America. It is, along with the Iowa Army National Guard, an element of the Iowa National Guard.

As state militia units, the units in the Iowa Air National Guard are not in the normal United States Air Force chain of command.  They are under the jurisdiction of the Governor of Iowa through the office of the Iowa Adjutant General unless they are federalized by order of the President of the United States.  The Iowa Air National Guard is headquartered at Camp Dodge, Johnston, and its commander is  Brigadier General Shawn Ford.

Overview
Under the "Total Force" concept, Iowa Air National Guard units are considered to be Air Reserve Components (ARC) of the United States Air Force (USAF).  Iowa ANG units are trained and equipped by the Air Force and are operationally gained by a Major Command of the USAF if federalized.  In addition, the Iowa Air National Guard forces are assigned to Air Expeditionary Forces and are subject to deployment tasking orders along with their active duty and Air Force Reserve counterparts in their assigned cycle deployment window.

Along with their federal reserve obligations, as state militia units the elements of the Iowa ANG are subject to being activated by order of the Governor to provide protection of life and property, and preserve peace, order and public safety. State missions include disaster relief in times of earthquakes, hurricanes, floods and forest fires, search and rescue, protection of vital public services, and support to civil defense.

Components
The Iowa Air National Guard consists of the following major units:
 132nd Wing
 Established 25 February 1941 (as: 124th Observation Squadron); operates: MQ-9 Reaper
 Stationed at: Des Moines Air National Guard Base
 Gained by: Air Combat Command
 The 132d Wing's operational mission is to deploy worldwide and execute directed tactical fighter sorties to destroy enemy forces, supplies, equipment, communications systems and installations with conventional weapons.

 185th Air Refueling Wing
 Established 23 August 1946 (as: 174th Fighter Squadron); operates: KC-135R Stratotanker
 Stationed at: Sioux City Air National Guard Base, Sergeant Bluff
 Gained by: Air Mobility Command
 The mission of the 185 ARW is to provide mid-air refueling and mobility sustainment in direct support of the global mission of the Air Force.

Support Unit Functions and Capabilities:
 133d Test Squadron
 Stationed at Fort Dodge, the 133d provides an effective and sustainable war fighting Command and Control (C2) capability through the professional test and evaluation of the Control and Reporting Center to include the development of future system upgrades and modernization.

History
On 24 May 1946, the United States Army Air Forces, in response to dramatic postwar military budget cuts imposed by President Harry S. Truman, allocated inactive unit designations to the National Guard Bureau for the formation of an Air Force National Guard. These unit designations were allotted and transferred to various State National Guard bureaus to provide them unit designations to re-establish them as Air National Guard units.

The Iowa Air National Guard origins date to the formation of the 132d Fighter Group at Des Moines Municipal Airport, Des Moines, receiving federal recognition on 23 August 1946. It was equipped with F-51D Mustangs and its mission was the air defense of the state.  In addition, the 174th Fighter Squadron was formed at Sioux Gateway Airport, Sioux City, receiving federal recognition on 23 August 1946. 18 September 1947, however, is considered the Iowa Air National Guard's official birth concurrent with the establishment of the United States Air Force as a separate branch of the United States military under the National Security Act.

On 1 October 1962 the 174th Tactical Fighter Squadron was expanded to a Group level, and the 185th Tactical Fighter Group received federal recognition and was activated.

Today, the 132d Fighter Wing  deploys worldwide and executes directed tactical fighter sorties to destroy enemy forces, supplies, equipment, communications systems and installations with conventional weapons. The 185th Air Refueling Wing provides mid-air refueling and mobility sustainment in direct support of the global mission of the Air Force.

After the September 11th, 2001 terrorist attacks on the United States, elements of every Air National Guard unit in Iowa has been activated in support of the Global War on Terrorism. Flight crews, aircraft maintenance personnel, communications technicians, air controllers and air security personnel were engaged in Operation Noble Eagle air defense overflights of major United States cities.  Also, Iowa ANG units have been deployed overseas as part of Operation Enduring Freedom in Afghanistan and Operation Iraqi Freedom in Iraq as well as other locations as directed.

See also

Iowa State Guard
Iowa Wing Civil Air Patrol

References

 Gross, Charles J (1996), The Air National Guard and the American Military Tradition, United States Dept. of Defense, 
 Iowa Air National Guard website

External links

 Iowa Air National Guard
 132nd Fighter Wing
 185th Air Refueling Wing

United States Air National Guard
Military in Iowa